Garrett Adelstein (born May 16, 1986) is an American professional poker player from Tucson, Arizona who focuses on live no-limit hold 'em cash games. He appeared on Survivor: Cagayan where he was the second player voted off.

Poker career
Adelstein focuses on live cash games. He was a coach at Phil Galfond's poker academy Run It Once until 2014. Adelstein is known for his aggression and large bets. Commentators say he isn't afraid to gamble.

Some of his biggest winnings from professional tournaments include a $48,000 win from the PokerStars Caribbean Adventure in 2008, $48,487 from the 2010 WSOP Main Event and $49,108 from the 2016 WSOP Main Event.

In 2017, he began appearing regularly on live poker shows including Live at the Bike hosted in The Bicycle Hotel & Casino in California and has appeared on the reboot of Poker After Dark. One of his most notable hands was against professional poker player Matt Berkey in the November broadcast of Poker After Dark for $459,000. His  beat Berkey's . The board came  giving both players three of a kind, and they went all-in on the river. Adelstein made a second appearance in the Poker After Dark episode Dead Money.

Adelstein-Lew controversy

On September 29, 2022, Adelstein lost a hand while playing on Hustler Casino Live, in a game featuring Phil Ivey. Her hand was an unimproved  versus Adelstein's . Although Lew had the better hand at the time, Adelstein was favored by 6% statistically to hit an out on the river and win the hand, although mathematical odds would favor a call from Robbi. The river was run twice and came first  and then , neither of which were outs for Adelstein. After Lew tabled her hand at showdown, Adelstein was visibly shaken. After mucking his next hand, he left the table, and shortly thereafter, a member of management escorted Lew away from the table. After some discussion, Adelstein obtained a refund of his bets, and then left the game. He later tweeted that he had been cheated. Lew claimed her innocence and shared the results of a polygraph test she took shortly after on 12th October 2022.

Survivor
In 2013, Adelstein appeared on Survivor: Cagayan as a member of the "Brains" tribe where he was the second player voted off. Adelstein managed to find a Hidden Immunity Idol, but elected not to bring it to Tribal Council. He regretted this as a mistake after being voted off.

Personal life
Adelstein currently resides in Manhattan Beach, California. He is married to Jennifer Stutland of Lexington, KY, a USC graduate.

References

External links
 Garrett Adelstein Hendon Mob profile

American poker players
Living people
1986 births
Survivor (American TV series) contestants